GoldWave is a commercial digital audio editing software product developed by GoldWave Inc, first released to the public in April 1993.

Features
GoldWave has an array of features bundled which define the program. They include:

Real-time graphic visuals, such as bar, waveform, spectrogram, spectrum, and VU meter.
Basic and advanced effects and filters such as noise reduction, compressor/expander, volume shaping, volume matcher, pitch, reverb, resampling, and parametric EQ.
Effect previewing
Saving and restoring effect presets
DirectX Audio plug-in support
A variety of audio file formats are supported, including WAV, MP3, Windows Media Audio, Ogg, FLAC, AIFF, AU, Monkey's Audio, VOX, mat, snd, and voc
Batch processing and conversion support for converting a set of files to a different format and applying effects
Multiple undo levels
Edit multiple files at once
Support for editing large files
Storage option available to use RAM

Previous versions and current compatibility
A version prior to the version 5 series still exists for download of its shareware version at the official website. 
All versions up to 4.26 can run on any 32-bit Windows operating system (versions up to 3.03 are 16-bit applications and cannot run in 64-bit versions of Windows). Since 2004, with the release of version 5, GoldWave has stopped supporting Windows versions such as 95, 98, and 98SE (although GoldWave will still run on Windows 98SE, albeit unsupported) and renders the software unusable on those systems. Also, the system requirements have increased slightly, since now a Pentium III of 700 MHz and DirectX 8 are now part of the minimum system requirements compared to the Pentium 2 of 300 MHz and DirectX 5 required by previous versions.
Version 6 released in 2014 only supports Windows 7 64-bit and above.

Reception
 GoldWave was used to analyze historic recordings from the Moon landing, including establishing the "missing word" from astronaut Neil Armstrong's famous line.
 Adam Young (aka Owl City) used GoldWave to record all his vocals on his first major label album Ocean Eyes.
 The videogame Megaman X 4 features English audio recorded using GoldWave.
The in-game announcement system, known as Vox in Half Life was created using GoldWave.

See also
Audacity
List of music software

References

External links
 

Audio editors
Shareware
Windows multimedia software
1993 software
Software companies of Canada